Clusia longipetiolata is a species of flowering plant in the family Clusiaceae. It is found only in Panama. It is threatened by habitat loss.

References

longipetiolata
Flora of Panama
Vulnerable plants
Taxonomy articles created by Polbot